Beit Horon is a communal Israeli settlement in the West Bank. Bordering Route 443 between Modi'in and Jerusalem, the biblical pass of Beit Horon (Joshua 10:10), after which it is named, it falls under the jurisdiction of Mateh Binyamin Regional Council.

The international community considers Israeli settlements in the West Bank illegal under international law, but the Israeli government disputes this.

History
Beit Horon was established on 1 December 1977.

According to ARIJ, Israel confiscated land from several surrounding Palestinian villages in order to construct Beit Horon:

1036 dunams were taken  from Beitunia, for Beit Horon and Giv'at Ze'ev,
863 dunams were taken  from Beit Ur al-Fauqa,
67 dunams were taken  from At-Tira,
61 dunams  were taken from Kharbatha al-Misbah.

Beit Horon is a joint Secular and Orthodox community.
A religious elementary school located in Beit Horon serves local children as well as those from surrounding villages. There are also three nurseries and kindergarten, two synagogues, a kollel, a mikvah for women and men, and a library.

See also
Battle of Beth Horon (166 BC)
Battle of Beth Horon (66)

References

External links
Official website

Community settlements
Populated places established in 1977
Mixed Israeli settlements
Mateh Binyamin Regional Council
1977 establishments in the Israeli Military Governorate
Israeli settlements in the West Bank